Faze means to frighten or cause hesitation to someone.

Faze may also refer to:
 Faze Action
 Faze (band) 1990s  
 FaZe Clan, a professional eSports organization
 Faze FM
 Faze (magazine), a Canadian magazine
 Faze (musician), Nigerian musician
 Faze TV (disambiguation)

See also
 Phase (disambiguation)